Alf Ball may refer to:

 Alf Ball (footballer, born 1890) (1890–1952), English footballer for Lincoln City
 Alf Ball (footballer, born 1873) (1873–1940), English footballer for Leicester Fosse and Preston North End

See also
 Alfred Ball (1921–2012), Royal Air Force officer